A spending review, or occasionally a comprehensive spending review, is a governmental process in the United Kingdom carried out by HM Treasury to set firm expenditure limits and, through public service agreements, define the key improvements that the public can expect from these resources.

Spending reviews typically focus upon one or several aspects of public spending while comprehensive spending reviews focus upon each government department's spending requirements from a zero base (i.e. without reference to past plans or, initially, current expenditure). The latter are named after the year in which they are announced – thus CSR07 (completed in October 2007) applies to financial years 2008–2011.

Other developed countries have similar review processes, e.g. Canada, New Zealand, The Netherlands, Italy, Ireland, and France. France conducted its first comprehensive spending review (called in French "la Révision Générale des Politiques Publiques") in 2008. The Netherlands have been carrying out spending reviews since 1981.

As a consequence of the COVID-19 pandemic, the 2020 review covered just a one-year period in contrast to previous years. The 2021 spending review was subsumed into the October 2021 budget.

2002 Spending Review
The 2002 Spending Review (SR02) set a target for expanding the role of voluntary sector organisations in the provision of public services, anticipating growth by 5% in the period to 2005-06.

2007 Comprehensive Spending Review
The UK's 2007 Comprehensive Spending Review included three significant changes. The first was that it represented the first test of the capacity of the Spending Review process to plan and deliver a discretionary fiscal consolidation in the UK. The previous four Spending Reviews took place during a period of steady public growth in the economy from 37% in 1999–00 to 42% by 2007–08. As both the UK's then fiscal rules (the "Golden Rule" and the sustainable investment rule) began to bite, the UK government desired to halve the real rate of growth in public spending from 4% per annum over the last decade to 2% per annum over the next three years – a 0.5% below than the trend rate of growth of the economy. A second noteworthy development in the 2007 CSR was a marked extension in the certainty that the UK system provided to public sector managers about their future budgets. Finally, CSR07 saw the UK's public service 110 largely departmental-based Public Service Agreements consolidated into 30 inter-departmental agreements.

2010 Spending Review

A spending review for the years 2011/12 through to 2014/15 was announced by the coalition government. This review was driven by a desire to reduce government spending in order to cut the budget deficit.

Chancellor of the Exchequer George Osborne announced the details of the spending review on 20 October 2010. The cuts were described as the biggest since World War II. The review led to an £81 billion cut in public spending in the following 4 years of the parliament, with average departmental cuts of 19%. In addition major changes in welfare were announced including £7 billion of extra welfare cuts, changes to incapacity benefit, housing benefit and tax credits and a rise in the state pension age to 66 from 2020. Public sector employees will face a £3.5 billion increase in public pension contributions.

The Home Office faced cuts of 25%, local councils would face a yearly 7% cut in funding from central government each year until 2014. The Ministry of Defence faced cuts of around 8%. In addition many other public sector bodies had cuts to their funding. Although not part of government the BBC had its licence fee frozen for 6 years and took on the funding of the BBC World Service, BBC Monitoring and S4C.
The Office for Budget Responsibility predicted that the spending review led to a loss of about 490,000 public sector jobs by 2015.
The NHS saw a 0.4% increase in spending in real terms over the following 4 years.

A £200 million payment was announced to compensate savers in the collapsed savings society Presbyterian Mutual.

A report published in late 2013 by Trust for London and the London School of Economics and Political Science estimated that local government budgets in London had taken a 33% real terms cut in central government funding for local government between 2009/10 and 2013/14.

2015 Spending Review
A spending review for the years 2016–17 to 2020-21 was announced by chancellor George Osborne alongside an Autumn Statement on 25 November 2015.

2020 Spending Review
Chancellor Rishi Sunak delivered his first spending review on 25 November 2020. In contrast to previous years, and as a consequence of the COVID-19 pandemic, the review covered a one-year period from 1 April 2021 to 31 March 2022.

2021 Spending Review
The 2021 spending review (SR21) was subsumed into the October 2021 budget. SR21 set departmental resource and capital budgets from 2022-23 to 2024-25 and covered the devolved administrations' block grants for the same period of time. Chancellor Jeremy Hunt's Autumn Statement of 17 November 2022 referred to the maintenance of committed budgets "for the remaining two years of this Spending Review".

See also
Multiannual Financial Framework

References

External links
Justin Tyson Implementing a 'Spending Review' -- Italy Seeks to Improve the Quality of Public Expenditure, International Monetary Fund, 12 November 2007
Richard Hughes United Kingdom Concludes Its Fifth Multi-Annual Spending Round International Monetary Fund, 5 May 2008
HM Treasury - Spending Review 2010
Guardian Special Report - Spending Review 2010
2004 Spending Review
Spending Review and Autumn Statement 2015 (Archived)

Government spending in the United Kingdom
United Kingdom budgets